Regency Records is a record label founded by Georgia record producer and TV/Radio syndicator Johnny Carter and North Georgia disc jockey Lamar Gravitt in 1965. Regency Records was originally a part of the C-R-Co (Cherokeeland Recording Company), based in Calhoun, Georgia near the 19th century national capital of the Cherokee Indians. The label operated as a part of Jay Enterprises when Carter moved to Tennessee in 1966, and became a part of Cherokee Album Corporation when Carter returned to Georgia in 1968. Regency released a series of singles, and one album in 1972 by a Tennessee garage band Neutral Spirits.  The self-titled album by the group is a highly prized collector's item worldwide, because most copies of the disc were destroyed in a fire. The original analog master tape was preserved by the producer, and has been released on CD, as well as by Florida re-release label GearFab.

Regency later became the home of the Dutch rock band Diesel in the early 1980s, releasing a pair of this band's albums, the first of which included the internationally successful hit, "Sausalito Summernight." During this period, Regency was distributed by Warner Communications.

Regency is now a division of National Recording Corporation, and records a mixture of genres in one of the largest state-of-the-art audio/video soundstages in the State of Georgia.

 List of record labels

American record labels
Record labels established in 1965